Pierre Soubeyran (6 November 1709, Geneva, Republic of Geneva – 12 April 1775, Geneva, Republic of Geneva) was an 18th-century engraver, etcher and Encyclopédiste, mainly active in Paris.

Biography 
Pierre Soubeyran was the son of the locksmith Pierre Soubeyran, a Huguenot refugees from Sauve, Languedoc and his wife Pernette de Bourdeau. 

He received his first graphic training by Daniel Gardelle (1679-1753) from Geneva, the brother of the painter and engraver Robert Gardelle. His protectors sent him in Paris to further training in 1730. Jean-Jacques Burlamaqui (1694-1748) encouraged him to train as etcher in Paris, where from 1742 to 1749 he was a member of the French Academy of Sciences. At times, he also received lessons by Georg Friedrich Schmidt.

In Paris, he acquired a solid reputation. Soubeyran soon became one of the most qualified engravers of his time. On 14 May 1748, he was appointed as Head of the Public Drawing School in Geneva, École de Dessein de Genève (later known as École Supérieure des Beaux-Arts, Genève).

Soubeyran wrote the article "Montre" for the Encyclopédie by Denis Diderot and d’Alembert.

Pierre Soubeyran is often mistaken with his cousin, Jean-Pierre Soubeyran (1708–1774), a miniaturist.

Main works 
His primary prints are:
 la Conversion de saint Bruno, after Le Sueur 
 la Belle villageoise, by Boucher 
 Portrait de Pierre le Grand, after Caravaggio 
 Une jeune fille devant son miroir, by Natoire
 Six Paysages, by Lucas van Uden.
 Most boards of the Traité des pierres antiques, by Mariette, after Bouchardon 
 Vignettes for the Hall of Mirrors of Versailles, by Massé

Bibliography 
 Ferdinand Hoefer: Nouvelle Biographie générale. t. 44, Firmin-Didot, Paris 1865, (p. 212–213)
 Danielle Buyssens: La carrière parisienne de Pierre Soubeyran, premier directeur de l'école publique de dessin de Genève. In Liber veritatis. 2007, (pp. 181–189)
 Danielle Buyssens: La question de l'art à Genève. 2008

References

External links 
 Pierre Soubeyran on data.bnf.fr
 Pierre Soubeyran on Wikisource

18th-century artists from the Republic of Geneva
Engravers from the Republic of Geneva
18th-century French engravers 
Contributors to the Encyclopédie (1751–1772)
1706 births
1775 deaths